John Daniel Breen (born July 10, 1950) is a senior United States district judge of the United States District Court for the Western District of Tennessee.

Education and career

Born in Jackson, Tennessee, Breen received a Bachelor of Arts degree from Spring Hill College in 1972 and a Juris Doctor from the University of Tennessee College of Law in 1975. He was in private practice in Jackson from 1975 to 1991. He served as United States magistrate judge of the U.S. District Court for the Western District of Tennessee from 1991 to 2003 before being nominated as a federal judge.

District court service

On January 7, 2003, Breen was nominated by President George W. Bush to a seat on the United States District Court for the Western District of Tennessee vacated by Julia Smith Gibbons. He was confirmed by the United States Senate on March 13, 2003 and received his commission on March 14, 2003. He served chief judge from August 8, 2013 to March 18, 2017. He assumed senior status on March 18, 2017.

Notable case

Breen presided over the case of Daniel Cowart and Paul Schlesselman, the perpetrators in the Barack Obama assassination plot in Tennessee. In 2010, Breen convicted the two of conspiracy to murder Obama and other African-American people and sentenced Cowart and Schlesselman to 14 and 10 years in federal prison respectively; both suspects pleaded guilty to conspiracy to their charges.

References

Sources

1950 births
Living people
Judges of the United States District Court for the Western District of Tennessee
People from Jackson, Tennessee
Spring Hill College alumni
United States district court judges appointed by George W. Bush
21st-century American judges
United States magistrate judges
University of Tennessee alumni